The 1993 Australia rugby union tour was a series of matches played in October and November 1993 in the United States, Canada and France by the Australia national rugby union team.

Results 
Scores and results list Australia's points tally first.

Notes

References 

Australia rugby union tour
Australia national rugby union team tours
Rugby union tours of Canada
Rugby union tours of the United States
Rugby union tours of France
Tour
Tour